Alexander Robert Fyffe ( 1811 – April 1854) was a New Zealand whaler and runholder. He was born in Perthshire, Scotland in c.1811.

References

1811 births
1854 deaths
New Zealand farmers
New Zealand people in whaling
People from Perthshire